Squash is an Asian Games sport since the 1998 edition and has been held at every edition since.

Editions

Events

Medal table

Participating nations

Finals

Men's singles

Women's singles

List of medalists

See also
 Asian Squash Federation

References 
Asian Games Medalists

 
Sports at the Asian Games
Asian Games
Asian Games